Charles Wentworth Upham (May 4, 1802 – June 15, 1875) was a U.S. Representative from Massachusetts.  Upham was also a member, and President of the Massachusetts State Senate, the 7th Mayor of Salem, Massachusetts, and twice a member of the Massachusetts State House of Representatives. Upham was the cousin of George Baxter Upham and Jabez Upham. Upham was later a historian of Salem and the Salem Witch Trials of 1692 when he lived there.

Biography
Charles Wentworth Upham was born in Saint John in the New Brunswick Colony of British Canada on May 4, 1802 to Col. Joshua Upham, Supreme Court Justice of New Brunswick, and his second wife Mary Chandler.  Joshua Upham was born in Brookfield, MA in 1741 and died in England in 1808.

Charles W. Upham married Ann Susan Holmes on March 29, 1826. She was the daughter of Rev. Abiel Holmes and Sarah Oliver Wendell.  Ann was the sister of Dr. Oliver Wendell Holmes, Sr.

Charles and Ann had 15 children all born in Salem, Massachusetts and only four survived to adulthood; Charles Wentworth Upham Jr. born in 1830 and died at the age of 30 in Buffalo, New York, married to Mary Haven, no children; William Phineas Upham born in 1836 and died in 1905, Newton, Massachusetts, married to Cynthia Bailey Nurse and had two daughters (Mary Wendell Upham and Elizabeth Upham); Sarah Wendell Upham born 1839 and died unmarried at 25; and Oliver Wendell Holmes Upham born in 1843 and died in 1905, Salem, Massachusetts, married to Caroline Ely Wilson, one daughter (Dorothy Quincy Upham, b. 1881) and one son (Charles Wentworth Upham, b. 1883).

He attended Harvard in the class of 1821, and was a member of the Porcellian Club. A classmate and former friend of Ralph Waldo Emerson, Upham was an opponent of the burgeoning Transcendentalism movement and later engineered for Nathaniel Hawthorne to be dismissed from his job at the Salem custom house. He also arranged for Jones Very to be institutionalized at McClean Asylum. Senator Charles Sumner once referred to Upham as "that smooth, smiling, oily man of God".

In 1858, Upham was elected a member of the American Antiquarian Society.

Upham died on June 15, 1875, in Salem, Massachusetts.

See also
 78th Massachusetts General Court (1857)
 79th Massachusetts General Court (1858)

Publications 

Life, Explorations and Public Services of John Charles Fremont. Ticknor and Fields, Boston, MA.  1856
Salem Witchcraft with an account of Salem Village and a history of opinions on Witchcraft and Kindred Subjects. Frederick Unger, New York, 1978 (Reprint), 2 vv.
"Salem Witchcraft and Cotton Mather A Reply". Morrisania, N.Y. 1869.  Public Domain. Project Gutenberg free eBook.
Lectures on Witchcraft Comprising a History of the Delusion in Salem in 1692 (1831) Kessinger Publishing (Reprint), 2003. 
A Discourse Delivered on the Sabbath After the Decease of the Hon. Timothy Pickering. Kessinger Publishing, United States, 2010 (Reprint). 
Eulogy on the Life and Character of Zachary Taylor. BiblioLife, LLC, USA (Reprint), 2009. 
Memoir of Francis Peabody, President of the Essex Institute. Pranava Books, 2008 (Reprinted on demand from 1868 edition.
Letters on the Logos (1828) Kessinger Publishing, 2003 (Reprint). 
Life of Sir Henry Vane, Fourth Governor of Massachusetts in the Library of American Biography, conducted by Jared Sparks Vol IV.

References
Ellis, George Edward:  Memoir of Charles Wentworth Upham (1877).

Notes

External links
 
 
 
Charles W. Upham at InfoPlease

1802 births
1875 deaths
Harvard Divinity School alumni
Politicians from Saint John, New Brunswick
Members of the Massachusetts House of Representatives
Massachusetts state senators
Presidents of the Massachusetts Senate
Mayors of Salem, Massachusetts
Massachusetts Republicans
Massachusetts Free Soilers
Whig Party members of the United States House of Representatives from Massachusetts
Members of the American Antiquarian Society
19th-century American politicians